West Grinstead was a railway station on the Steyning Line which served the village of West Grinstead. It had a goods yard with a cattle loading bay and facilities for handling horse boxes. With the hunt kennels and national stud based in the area, the station saw substantial horse traffic.

The station closed as a result of the Beeching Axe in 1966 and now forms part of the Downs Link footpath. The main station building and station worker's cottages, although now privately owned, remain, as do the station platforms. The local parish council have erected a replica station sign in the vicinity, and an old railway signal has also been installed. A British Railways Mark 1 coach has also been placed on rails in the former goods yard.

Gallery

See also 

 List of closed railway stations in Britain

References 

Disused railway stations in West Sussex
Railway stations in Great Britain opened in 1861
Railway stations in Great Britain closed in 1966
Beeching closures in England
1861 establishments in England
Former London, Brighton and South Coast Railway stations